World Trade Center Istanbul (WTCI) (İDTM) is a service company established in 1982 and based in Yeşilköy, Istanbul, Turkey, which, to promote international commerce and world trade, provides commercial information and market research services, organizes trade delegation programs, operates fair areas and offers office, convention and meeting halls, runs hotels within its organization. It is owned by Istanbul Chamber of Commerce, Union of Chambers and Commodity Exchanges of Turkey, Istanbul Metropolitan Municipality, Bakırköy Municipality, Istanbul Chamber of Industry, Istanbul Commodity Exchange as well as Economic Development Foundation of Turkey.

The complex of World Trade Center Istanbul covers an area of  situated next to the Atatürk International Airport. It has a subway station and a vast parking lot for 6,000 cars in total.

Services and facilities
Istanbul Expo Center (Istanbul Fuar Merkezi) IFM
organizes about 100 national and international trade fairs each year. The parking lot of the fair ground can hold 4,300 cars.

WTC Istanbul Business Center 
In addition, there are three shopping floors. Its parking lot is capable of 1,700 cars.

Convention Center
The complex houses also the biggest convention center in Istanbul with a seating capacity for 4,000 visitors.

Hotels
There are two hotels, a four-star airport hotel with 1,250-bed capacity and another five-star hotel.

Notable events hosted
 Futurallia Istanbul 2013 - International Business Meetings Forum, June 5-7, 2013
 10th Turkish Language Olympiads, June 1-3, 2012
 40th Chess Olympiad, August 27-September 10, 2012

References

Buildings and structures in Istanbul
Companies based in Istanbul
Economy of Istanbul
Convention centers in Turkey
Trade fairs in Turkey
Tourist attractions in Istanbul
Sports venues in Istanbul
Bakırköy
Istanbul
Companies established in 1982
1982 establishments in Turkey
Service companies of Turkey